Catherine Maude Nichols (6 October 1847 – 30 January 1923) was a British painter and printmaker. She was born in Norwich, England, and is notable for being one of the first "lady fellows" of the Royal Society of Painter-Etchers, elected in 1882.

Biography 
Born in 1847, her father was W.P. Nichols, a prominent surgeon, Liberal, and former Mayor of Norwich. Her father also collected oil paintings and encouraged her love of art, sending her to the local art school, and willing her money specifically to help further her career. She studied wood engraving at the Norwich School of Art and won a prize for her work there in 1874.

Nichols made her debut at the Royal Academy of Arts in 1877. Throughout her career, she produced over 200 etchings, many of them of her home county, Norfolk.

References

External links 

1847 births
1923 deaths
20th-century English women artists
19th-century English women artists
19th-century English painters
20th-century English painters
19th-century British printmakers
20th-century British printmakers
Artists from Norwich
English women painters
Women printmakers